The Virginia Natural Area Preserve System is a system of protected areas in the state of Virginia. It is managed by the Virginia Department of Conservation and Recreation.

, there are sixty-six (66) dedicated preserves in Virginia, containing examples of some of the rarest natural communities in the state; in addition, many serve as a home for locally, nationally, and globally rare species.

History
In 1986, the Virginia Natural Heritage Program was formed through a cooperative agreement between the Commonwealth of Virginia and The Nature Conservancy. In 1988 the program was placed under the control of the Virginia Department of Conservation and Recreation (DCR). To further the Natural Heritage Program's mission to conserve and manage sites identified as significant natural areas within the state, The Virginia Natural Area Preserve System was established in 1989. 

The system's first preserve, North Landing River Natural Area Preserve, was established in 1990. By 2007, the preserve system included 50 protected areas.

Description
The Virginia Natural Area Preserve System is managed as part of the Natural Heritage Program of the Virginia Department of Conservation and Recreation, with the purpose of protecting threatened or rare plants, animals, and natural communities. 

To become a part of the system, a Natural Area Preserve must be accepted by the director of the Department of Conservation and Recreation, although they may be initially dedicated by other departments and agencies of the Commonwealth of Virginia. Natural Area Preserves may be acquired by the Commonwealth of Virginia, or may continue to be owned by independent conservation organizations or other private landowners. Dedication itself is similar to a conservation easement, as it places certain legal strictures on future development of a given portion of land.

Access
Most properties are owned by the state's Department of Conservation and Recreation. However, some are owned by local governments, universities, private citizens, and independent conservation organizations, such as The Nature Conservancy. 

Many state-owned properties are freely open to the public for low-impact uses, such as hiking and birdwatching. However, some state-owned properties with rare and/or species and habitats require that arrangements be made with a state-employed land steward prior to visitation. 

Privately held properties may restrict public access, although sometimes it can be arranged in coordination with a preserve's owner. 

Access to any individual Virginia Natural Area Preserve may be temporarily restricted or closed when it is determined as necessary to protect sensitive plant and animal populations within the preserve, for seasonal migration habitat, or for habitat management and ecological restoration activities, such as prescribed burns.   Visitor impactful activities, such as camping, hunting, fishing, timber cutting, campfires, vegetation harvesting, and motorized trail vehicles are typically forbidden at all preserves.

List of Virginia Natural Area Preserves

The following table lists Virginia's Natural Area Preserves . Those listed as being accessible "by arrangement" require prospective visitors to contact either state-employed land stewards, private property owners, or both.

See also

Virginia Wildlife Management Areas
List of Virginia state forests
List of Virginia state parks

References

External links
Virginia Department of Conservation and Recreation.gov: official Natural Area Preserve System website — all current NAPS preserves.

 01
.
Environment of Virginia
Protected areas of Virginia
Virginia Department of Conservation and Recreation
Protected areas established in 1989
1989 establishments in Virginia